The Bachelor's Degree Extraordinary Award (also the Extraordinary Prize of Bachelor's Degree, Extraordinary Prize of Degree, Special Award of Bachelor's Degree or Extraordinary End-of-Degree Award, Premio Extraordinario de Fin de Carrera or Premio Extraordinario de Licenciatura/Grado, in Spanish), is the official and prestigious university academic award granted annually by each university in Spain to university students who have completed their Bachelor's Degree with the best academic results, the best academic record and with the highest grade point average (GPA) in their class.

It is a Spanish academic award for the best academic results at university, given to the student with the highest academic standing among their graduating class. It is similar to the valedictorian used in the United States, to the dux (Latin for "leader"), to the Major de promotion ("first in class") in France or to the Academic Excellence Award (Bachelor's Award) or the Outstanding Academic Achievement Award in some universities such as the Central European University.

The Award 
The Bachelor's Degree Extraordinary Award is awarded annually by the Governing Council of each Spanish university, for each academic degree that the university offers (Medicine, Law, Economics, ...), to students who have the best academic records (with an academic record full of distinctions and Honours).

As a university award, each university approves its own regulations on the awarding of the Bachelor's Degree Extraordinary Award. The extraordinary awards will be granted by the Rector at the proposal of the Centers, Faculties or Schools. The prizes usually have an economic endowment, either in direct mode or in way of exemption of payments in subsequent studies.

Award name 
As the prize is awarded by each university, there may be some slight variation in the name, but most universities follow the same name. This award which rewards and recognizes the excellence in academic career is called:

Bachelor's Degree Extraordinary Award (Premio Extraordinario de Licenciatura/Grado, in Spanish)
Extraordinary End-of-Degree Award (Premio Extraordinario de Fin de Carrera, in Spanish)
 Extraordinary End-of-Studies Award (Premio Extraordinario de Fin de Estudios, in Spanish)
 Extraordinary Prize of Degree or Extraordinary Prize of Bachelor's Degree (Premio Extraordinario de Licenciatura/Grado, in Spanish)
 Extraordinary Degree Award (Premio Extraordinario de Licenciatura/Grado, in Spanish)

Notable people awarded with the Bachelor's Degree Extraordinary Award 
Among famous students who were awarded by their university with the Bachelor's Degree Extraordinary Award for having the best academic record of their class at university:

 Mariano Rajoy, conferred by the University of Santiago de Compostela.
Soraya Saénz de Santamaría, conferred by the University of Valladolid.
 Enrique Tierno Galván, conferred by the Complutense University of Madrid.
 Mario Conde, conferred by the University of Deusto.
 José Ignacio Wert, conferred by the Complutense University of Madrid.
Jordi Solé Tura, conferred by the University of Barcelona
Macarena Olona Choclán, conferred by the University of Alicante.
Gustavo Villapalos, conferred by the Complutense University of Madrid.
Alberto Oliart, conferred by the University of Barcelona
 Pablo Iglesias, conferred by the Complutense University of Madrid.
 Cristóbal Montoro, conferred by the Autonomous University of Madrid.
José Luis Escrivá, conferred by the Complutense University of Madrid.
Gonzalo Caballero, conferred by the University of Vigo.

See also 

 Valedictorian
 Class rank
 Dux
 Grade inflation
 Latin honors
Honours
Bachelor's Thesis Award

References 

Academic terminology
Academic honours
Qualifications
Education awards
Education in Spain